Fredric Neal Busch (born 1958) is a Weill Cornell Medical College professor of clinical psychiatry based in New York City. He is also a faculty member at the Columbia University Center for Psychoanalytic Training and Research.

Dr. Busch has co-written several manuals and articles on focused psychodynamic approaches to psychiatric disorders, including anxiety, panic and depression. He has been involved in research on panic focused psychodynamic psychotherapy, including the first study to demonstrate efficacy of psychodynamic treatment of panic disorder, published in the American Journal of Psychiatry.  Additionally, Dr. Busch has written on integrating the theoretical conceptualizations and clinical approaches of psychoanalytic treatments and medication, and coauthoring two seminal papers on treatment triangles, addressing the complex interactions of the psychotherapist, psychopharmacologist, and patient.  He has also written about psychodynamic approaches to behavior change and to trauma. He is involved in a research project 
using this treatment for Veterans with Post-traumatic stress disorder at the Veterans Administration New York Harbor Healthcare System.

Busch attended Duke University for his undergraduate degree, University of Texas medical school, Payne Whitney psychiatric residency program in New York City, and the Columbia Center for Psychoanalytic Training and Research.

Bibliography

 .

References

1958 births
Living people
American male writers
American psychiatrists
Columbia University faculty
Duke University alumni
University of Texas alumni